Etyek is a village in Fejér County, Hungary, approximately 30 km from Budapest. The area is surrounded by vineyards and is known for its wine-production. The Korda Studios film production facility has been established there.

Events 
 Föld napja (April second last Sundays)
 Etyeki Pincefesztivál (May) 
 Etyeki Búcsú (first weekend in July)
 Etyeki Kezes-Lábos Gasztronómiai Fesztivál (September end)

Gallery

External links

  in Hungarian
 Street map 
 Spherical panorama from Etyek in Karpatmedence360 

Populated places in Fejér County
Hungarian German communities